The enigma garden eel (Heteroconger enigmaticus) is a species of eel in the conger/garden eel family Congridae.

Taxonomy
The enigma garden eel was first described in 1999 by Peter Henry John Castle and John Ernest Randall. The species epithet enigmaticus is derived from the Greek 'αινιγματικός' (enigmatikós), meaning 'enigmatic.'

Description 
This species is a tropical marine eel that is harmless to humans. It is medium to dark brown in colour.

Distribution and habitat 
The enigma garden eel is found in the western Pacific Ocean, including Indonesia and New Guinea.

References

Heteroconger
Taxa named by Peter Henry John Castle
Taxa named by John Ernest Randall
Fish described in 1999